The sixth local elections for the election of local mayors of the municipalities of the Republic of Macedonia and members of municipality councils were held on schedule in 2013. There were two large coalitions on the elections: the Coalition for a Better Macedonia led by VMRO-DPMNE and the Union for the Future led by SDSM. Also present on the elections was the Democratic Union for Integration (DUI), Democratic Party of Albanians (DPA) and the Union of Roma Forces. There was also coalition made between the two major rival parties VMRO-DPMNE and SDSM in Kičevo and Struga municipalities against the ethnic Albanian candidates Fatmir Dehari and Ramiz Merko of DUI. There were two rounds in the elections on March 24, 2013 and April 7, 2013. The first round of elections were declared the most peaceful elections in the history of independent Macedonia without any serious incidents. The elections were however not untainted, as the situation in the Centar Municipality was labeled as undemocratic by the Macedonian opposition with several voters being labeled as questionable for having only recently received their national ID cards and not being actual inhabitants of this respective municipality. The elections in this municipality lasted for three turns and were monitored by the foreign embassies.

Final results of mayoral elections

References

External links 
 Official website of the State Election Committee of Macedonia

2013
2013 elections in Europe
2013 in the Republic of Macedonia
March 2013 events in Europe
April 2013 events in Europe